Broeker is a Low German surname. It may be derived from the personal name Broekaert (Flemish version of Burchard and its numerous variants) or be a habitational name for a person living in a marsh (Dutch: broek).

Notable people with the surname include:
Nick Broeker (born 2000), American football player
Pat Broeker (born 1950), American member of the Church of Scientology
Peter Broeker (1926–1980), Canadian Formula One driver
Thomas Broeker (born 1985), German footballer

See also 
Breuker
Brooker (disambiguation)

References 

Dutch-language surnames
Low German surnames